Put It Down may refer to:

 "Put It Down" (Redman song), 2007
 "Put It Down" (T-Pain & Ray L song), 2007
 "Put It Down" (Bun B song), 2010
 "Put It Down" (Brandy song), 2012
 "Put It Down" (South Park), an episode from the twenty-first season of the series South Park